The  was a DC electric multiple unit (EMU) commuter train type introduced in 1957 by Japanese National Railways (JNR), and formerly operated by East Japan Railway Company (JR East) and West Japan Railway Company (JR-West). The last remaining trains were withdrawn in November 2003.

History
The prototype 101 series set was delivered in June 1957, as a 10-car (4+6-car) set classified as 90 series with all cars motored. Cab cars were numbered MoHa 90500 to 90503, and the intermediate cars were numbered MoHa 90000 to 90005. Production sets were delivered from March 1958, differing visually from the prototype in having exposed rain gutters along the top of each car. The 90 series was reclassified as 101 series from 1959, with the prototype set cars numbered in the 900 subseries. The prototype set was modified in 1962 to bring it up to production set standards.

Lines used
101 series trains operated on the following lines.

Tokyo Area
 Chūō Line (Rapid) (1957-1985)
 Itsukaichi Line (1978-1985)
 Keihin-Tohoku Line (1970-1978)
 Musashino Line (1973-1986)
 Nambu Line (1969-1991 for commuter rail services; 1980 - November 2003 for Branch line services)
 Chūō-Sōbu Line (1963-1988)
 Tsurumi Line (1980-1992)
 Yamanote Line (1961-1968)
 Akabane Line (Now Saikyō Line) (1967-1978)

Osaka Area
 Kansai Main Line
 Katamachi Line (1976-1992)
 Osaka Loop Line (1964-1991)
 Sakurajima Line (1961-1991)

Private operators
A number of former 101 series trains were sold to the private railway operator Chichibu Railway in Saitama Prefecture in 1986, where they operated as 3-car 1000 series sets until March 2014.

Preserved examples
 KuMoHa 101-902 is preserved at The Railway Museum in Saitama, previously preserved at JR East's Tokyo General Rolling Stock Center.
 A 101 series mock-up car is exhibited at the Kyoto Railway Museum.

References

External links

 

Electric multiple units of Japan
East Japan Railway Company
West Japan Railway Company
Train-related introductions in 1957
1958 in rail transport
1500 V DC multiple units of Japan